The 1984 Currie Cup was the 46th edition of the Currie Cup, the premier annual domestic rugby union competition in South Africa.

See also

 Currie Cup

References

1984
1984 in South African rugby union
1984 rugby union tournaments for clubs